Julio González (born 1902, date of death unknown) was a Spanish fencer. He competed in the individual and team sabre events at the 1924 Summer Olympics.

References

External links
 

1902 births
Year of death missing
Spanish male sabre fencers
Olympic fencers of Spain
Fencers at the 1924 Summer Olympics